The Dzhida is a river in the south of Buryatia, Russia, a left tributary of the Selenga.

Geography 

One of the largest rivers of Buryatia originates in the extreme west of the Khangarul ridge, 3 km east of the Russian-Mongolian border. The first third of the current Dzhida runs in a narrow gorge from northwest to southeast along the mountain taiga in the west of the Zakamensky district. Near the city of Zakamensk, the river turns to the east and flows parallel to the Dzhidinskiy ridge (from the south) and the Maly Khamar-Daban ridge (from the north). Below Zakamensk, the gorges of the river valley alternate with extended areas.

Within the Dzhida region, the river takes a more calm character, the valley expands. In the lower reaches the river flows along the southern edge of the Borgoy steppe. 8 km below the village of Dzhida the river flows into Selengu opposite the саenbėn ulus. In the lower reaches, above the station of Dzhida, the riverbed crosses the southern line of the East Siberian Railway Ulan-Ude-Naushki. For 150 km along the left, northern, bank of the river between the villages Oyor and Dutulur passes the regional road P440 Gusinoozersk - Zakamensk (Dzhidinskiy trakt).

Settlements on the banks of the Dzhida and its valley (from the source to the mouth): Engorgoy, Nurt, Zakamensk, Khuzhir, Dutulur, Tsakir, Khamnei, Usanovka, Ust-Burgaltay, Mikhailovka, Ulekchin, Kharatsai, Naryn, Khuldat, Shartykey, Oyor, Old Ukyrchelon, Tohoy, Zheltura, Tangrek, Mill, Bayan, Bulyk, Petropavlovka, Tasarhai, Botsiy, Upper Yonhor, Nyugui, Yonhor, Dyrestuy, Dzhida.

Hydrology 

Feeding rainwater. The water flow in the mouth is 60 m³ / s.

The average annual water discharge in the area of the village of Djida (21 km from the mouth) is 73.54 m³ / s. Average monthly water charges (observations from 1939 to 1997)

The data of the water register 

According to the State Water Register of Russia and the geoinformation system for water management of the territory of the Russian Federation, prepared by the Federal Agency for Water Resources [3]:

Basin District - Angara-Baikal
The river basin is Selenga (the Russian part of the basins)
The river sub-basin is absent
Water management site - Jida
Code of water body - 16030000112116300006973

Main tributaries 

(distance from the mouth)

158 km - the river Zheltura (right)
328 km - the river Hamnya (left)
438 km - the river Tsakirka (left)

See also
Selenga Highlands
List of rivers of Russia

References

External links 

 Реки России. Река Джида
 Река Джида
 Dzhida At Dzhida

Rivers of Buryatia